This article presents a full discography of the Canadian band Men Without Hats.

Albums

Studio albums

Compilation albums
 Collection (1996)
 Greatest Hats (1997)
 The Very Best of Men Without Hats (1997)
 My Hats Collection (2006)
 The Silver Collection (2008)

Extended plays
 Folk of the 80's (1980)
 Freeways (1985)
 Again (Part 1) (2021)

Singles

Videography

Music videos 

 "Security" (1980)
 "Antarctica" (1980)
 "Nationale 7" (1981)
 "The Safety Dance" (1982)
 "I Got the Message" (1982)
 "I Like" (1982)
 "Where Do the Boys Go?" (1984)
 "Pop Goes the World" (1987)
 "Moonbeam" (1987)
 "Hey Men" (1989)
 "In the 21st Century" (1989)
 "Sideways" (1991)

Video releases 
 Live Hats (2006) - DVD

Covers
 The Adventures of Women & Men Without Hate in the 21st Century featured a cover of ABBA's "SOS"
 Sideways featured a cover of The Beatles' "I Am the Walrus" (subtitled "'No You're Not', Said Little Nicola").
 The Collection and Greatest Hats compilations featured a cover of Roxy Music's "Editions of You"

References

External links 
 
 

Discographies of Canadian artists
Pop music group discographies
New wave discographies